Tabata Station is the name of two train stations in Japan:

 Tabata Station (Nagano) - (田畑駅) in Nagano Prefecture
 Tabata Station (Tokyo) - (田端駅) in Tokyo